The Day Before the Wedding is a 1952 West German comedy film directed by Rolf Thiele and starring Paul Dahlke, Elisabeth Müller, and Joachim Brennecke. It was shot at the Göttingen Studios. The film's sets were designed by the art director Walter Haag.

Plot 
Surprisingly, high-ranking visitors have announced themselves in a sleepy small town: the Federal President himself is expected! But since the mayor's daughter wants to get married on this very day, the marriage must be postponed - at least that's what the bride's father thinks. Thea naturally sees things completely differently, and then resorts to a white lie in order not to have to let the long-desired appointment burst. The rest of the population is also thrown into all sorts of hectic activities in anticipation of the excitedly awaited state visit. The high-ranking gentlemen on the city council are arguing like tinkers about what special measures should be taken for the highest representative of the still young Federal Republic, while the opposition, in turn, has leaflets printed quickly.  

Even the elderly colonel von Hanfstaengl finally feels asked again after a long time, since he hopes to be able to hoist the German flag on the presidential arrival. Amid all the hustle and bustle, an escaped canary manages to bring two lonely hearts together, while the culture officer finally confesses his love to the mayor's secretary as they work nights together in preparation for the visit. The Federal President arrives the next morning, and with her trick Thea has managed to finally marry her Hermann at the same time. All the hustle and bustle dissolves into pleasure, and the Federal President appreciates all the excitement of his officials with a benevolent expression

Cast

References

Bibliography

External links 
 

1952 films
West German films
German comedy films
1952 comedy films
1950s German-language films
Films directed by Rolf Thiele
German black-and-white films
1950s German films
Films shot at Göttingen Studios